Muhammad Munawar Mirza (Punjabi) (born 27 Mar 1923 – 7 February 2000), was a prominent Iqbal scholar, historian, writer and intellectual from Pakistan.

His granddaughter, Ambreen Salahuddin, is a poet and writer.

Life and contribution

Born on 23 March 1923, he did his master's degree in Urdu, Arabic and Philosophy from the University of the Punjab. He started his teaching career in 1953, which continued, to his Government College years until his retirement in 1980. He was appointed the chairman, Department of Iqbal Studies, university Oriental College, Lahore from 1981 to 1985. He was appointed Director Iqbal Academy Pakistan from 1985 to 1988 and then from 1991 to 1993. He was a Member and office holder of many Committees and formations. Prof. Muhammad Munawwar wrote a large number of books relating to Iqbal Studies, Pakistan Movement, Islamic Studies, Literature and other topics. He contributed hundreds of articles on various topics, which were published in journals of International repute. He also translated a number of books from Arabic and English to Urdu. He attended a large number of National and International Conferences held in Pakistan and abroad. His book relating to the Iqbal Studies entitled Iqbal and Quranic Wisdom won the National Presidential Iqbal Award in 1986. As an acknowledgment and token of appreciation of his contributions, Prof. Muhammad Munawwar was awarded Sitara-i-Imtiaz by the Government of Pakistan.
His son in law Salahuddin Ayyubi is also a prolific writer. His grand daughter Ambreen Salahuddin and her husband Sajjad Bloch are renowned poets.

Works
Some of his major publications include:

Books
Iqbal : poet-philosopher of Islam
Iqbal and Quranic wisdom
Dimensions of Pakistan movement
Mīzān-i Iqbāl. Critical study of the Persian and Urdu poetry of Sir Muhammad Iqbal, 1877–1938, with emphasis on his forceful advocacy of Panislamism
Dimensions of Iqbal
Iqbal on human perfection
Burhān-i Iqbāl. On the religious convictions of Sir Muhammad Iqbal, 1877–1938, national poet of Pakistan
ʻAllāmah Iqbāl kī Fārsī g̲h̲azal
Qirt̤ās-i Iqbāl. Articles based on the ideology and works of Sir Muhammad Iqbal, 1877–1938; a research study
Abḥāth dhikrá Iqbāl al-miʼawīyah. In Arabic
Pākistān, ḥiṣār-i Islām. Articles on the history and politics of Pakistan written during a span of 50 years
Īqān Iqbāl
Maz̤āmīn-i Munavvar. Critical essays on 19th and 20th century Urdu authors
Karam farmā. Short biographical sketches of Pakistani celebrities belonging to different walk of life
Īqān-i Iqbāl
Aulād-i Ādam

Translations
Tīn Musalmān failsūf. Translation from the English of Seyyed Hossein Nasr's Three Muslim Sages: Avicenna—Suhrawardi—Ibn Arabi
Siyāsatʹnāmah. Translation from the Arabic of Nizam al-Mulk's Siyasatnama

See also
Iqbaliat

References

External links
Articles
Iqbaliyat Kay Sau Saal, from Iqbal Cyber Library
Obituaries, from Iqbal Review
Other
Books By Iqbal, from Bahoo.org
Iqbal Awards, from Iqbal Academy Pakistan
Department of Iqbal Studies, from Punjab University

Directors of Iqbal Academy
Iqbal scholars
20th-century Muslim scholars of Islam
Academic staff of the Government College University, Lahore
Pakistani scholars
1927 births
Recipients of Sitara-i-Imtiaz
2000 deaths
University of the Punjab alumni
20th-century Pakistani poets
Poets from Lahore
People from Sargodha District